Chahar Khaneh Sar-e Bala (also Romanized as Chahār Khāneh Sar-e Bālā) is a village in Layl Rural District, in the Central District of Lahijan County, Gilan Province, Iran. At the 2006 census, its population was 21, in 6 families.

References 

Populated places in Lahijan County